Skautafélag Reykjavíkur, also known as SR for short, is an Icelandic sports club, founded in 1873 and based in Reykjavík, Iceland. It is best known for its ice hockey teams that have played in the Icelandic Men's Hockey League and the Icelandic Women's Hockey League.

Football

Men's football

Notable players
 Heiðar Helguson

Ice hockey

Men's ice hockey

The club has won the Icelandic Men's Hockey League six times, which is second only to Skautafélag Akureyrar.

Achievements
Icelandic champions: (5) 1999, 2000, 2006, 2007, 2009.

Notable players
 Robbie Sigurðsson

External links
 Official site
 Team profile on eurohockey.com

Ice hockey teams in Iceland
Ice hockey clubs established in 1873
1873 establishments in Iceland
Icelandic Hockey League
Sport in Reykjavík